Palaua  may refer to:
 Palaua (plant), a plant genus in the family Actinidiaceae
 Palaua (gastropod), a land snail genus in the family Euconulidae
 Palaua, a genus of flatworms in the family Palauidae.